Wiggle Your Ears is a 1929 Our Gang short silent comedy film directed by Robert F. McGowan. It was the 84th Our Gang short that was released.

Cast

The Gang
 Joe Cobb as Joe
 Jean Darling as Jean
 Allen Hoskins as Farina
 Bobby Hutchins as Wheezer
 Mary Ann Jackson as Mary Ann
 Harry Spear as Harry
 Pete the Pup as himself

See also
 Our Gang filmography

References

External links

1929 films
American black-and-white films
Films directed by Robert F. McGowan
Hal Roach Studios short films
American silent short films
1929 comedy films
Our Gang films
1920s American films
Silent American comedy films
1920s English-language films